Isakovo is a rural locality (a village) in Nizhneshardengskoye Rural Settlement, Velikoustyugsky District, Vologda Oblast, Russia. The population was 9 as of 2002.

Geography 
Isakovo is located 40 km south of Veliky Ustyug (the district's administrative centre) by road. Bolshoy Dvor is the nearest rural locality.

References 

Rural localities in Velikoustyugsky District